Hasseh (also Romanized as Ḩaşşeh, Ḩaşeh, and Ḩasseh; also known as Hasteh and Shahrak ol Mahdī) is a village in Qahab-e Shomali Rural District, in the Central District of Isfahan County, Isfahan Province, Iran. At the 2006 census, its population was 10,942, in 2,652 families.

References 

Populated places in Isfahan County